Club Patín Cuencas Mineras is a Spanish roller hockey club based in Lena, in the autonomous community of Asturias.

History
CP Cuencas Mineras was established in 2014 as a result of the merge of three teams: CP El Pilar, CP Mieres and CD Patinalón.

On 3 June 2018, the club promoted for the first time ever to the OK Liga Femenina.

Season to season

References

External links
CP Cuencas Mineras Facebook page 
CP Cuencas Mineras at Amigos del Cibeles website 

Spanish rink hockey clubs
Sports clubs established in 2014
Sports teams in Asturias